Inermocoelotes deltshevi is a funnel-web spider species found in North Macedonia and Bulgaria.

See also 
 List of Agelenidae species

References

External links 

Inermocoelotes
Spiders of Europe
Spiders described in 1996